Annenriede (also: Annengraben, in its lower course: Heidkruger Bäke) is a river of Lower Saxony, Germany. It flows into the Delme near Delmenhorst.

See also
List of rivers of Lower Saxony

References

Rivers of Lower Saxony
Rivers of Germany